The London and North Eastern Railway Class K5 consisted of a single rebuild of LNER Class K3 2-6-0 No. 206 (later No. 61863), rebuilt in 1945 by Edward Thompson. The rebuilt locomotive had a new boiler and two, instead of three, cylinders following earlier rebuilds of other Gresley designs. The clear aim of the rebuilds was to move away from the well established three cylinder policy achieving similar results through higher boiler pressure and two larger cylinders. Easier maintenance and greater availability was the objective.

Sources

External links
 The Gresley K3 and Thompson K5 2-6-0 Moguls LNER Encyclopedia

Railway locomotives introduced in 1945
2-6-0 locomotives
K5
Standard gauge steam locomotives of Great Britain
Scrapped locomotives

Rebuilt locomotives 
Individual locomotives